Khusniddin Norbekov (born 23 May 1987) is a Uzbekistani Paralympic athlete with cerebral palsy. He represented Uzbekistan at the Summer Paralympics in 2012, 2016 and 2021. In total, he won two gold medals and one bronze medal. At the 2016 Summer Paralympics, he won the gold medal in the men's discus throw F37 and the bronze medal in the men's shot put F37 event. At the 2020 Summer Paralympics, he won the gold medal in the men's shot put F35 event.

He competed at the 2011 IPC Athletics World Championships held in Christchurch, New Zealand without winning a medal. He competed in the men's discus throw F37/38 and men's shot put F37/38 events. At the 2017 World Para Athletics Championships held in London, United Kingdom, he won the silver medal in the men's shot put F37 event.

In 2019, he qualified to represent Uzbekistan at the 2020 Summer Paralympics after winning the gold medal in the men's shot put F35 event at the World Para Athletics Championships held in Dubai, United Arab Emirates. He also set a new world record in this event.

References

External links 
 

Living people
1987 births
People from Navoiy Region
Track and field athletes with cerebral palsy
Athletes (track and field) at the 2012 Summer Paralympics
Athletes (track and field) at the 2016 Summer Paralympics
Athletes (track and field) at the 2020 Summer Paralympics
Medalists at the 2016 Summer Paralympics
Medalists at the 2020 Summer Paralympics
Paralympic gold medalists for Uzbekistan
Paralympic bronze medalists for Uzbekistan
Paralympic medalists in athletics (track and field)
Paralympic athletes of Uzbekistan
World record holders in Paralympic athletics
World Para Athletics Championships winners
Uzbekistani male discus throwers
Uzbekistani male shot putters
21st-century Uzbekistani people
Medalists at the 2010 Asian Para Games
Medalists at the 2014 Asian Para Games
Medalists at the 2018 Asian Para Games